AldrichPears Associates is an interpretive planning and exhibit design firm based in Vancouver, British Columbia, Canada. They work for museums, science centers, interpretive centers, zoos, aquariums, botanical gardens, and children's museums around the world. 
AldrichPears Associates is best known for designing the exhibits at the Desert Living Center at the Las Vegas Springs Preserve, Nevada, a LEED-certified project that explores sustainable living in the desert and the Museo del Acero, a steel museum housed in a restored blast furnace, at Parque Fundidora. This museum interprets the scientific and cultural history of steelmaking in Mexico.

Profile 
Ron Pears and Phil Aldrich founded AldrichPears Associates in 1979. The company has grown steadily and now employs 30 content developers, graphic designers and exhibit designers. In 2007, after 11 years with AldrichPears, Isaac Marshall became the third principal of the firm. They are a full service firm that works with informal learning institutions from the initial conceptual planning phases of a project through design development and the final building contract and administration phases.

Recent work 
AldrichPears has been internationally recognized for its design work on many projects. They are known in North America for their work and are gaining a foothold in the global market with projects in the Middle East, Europe and Asia.

Interpretive centers 
Denali Visitor Center, Alaska
Alaska Islands and Ocean Visitor Center, Homer, Alaska
Northwest Arctic Heritage Center, Kotzebue, Alaska
Kodiak Refuge Visitors Center, Kodiak, Alaska
Tillamook Forest Center, Tillamook, Oregon
Sheikh Zayed Desert Learning Centre, Al Ain, United Arab Emirates
Desert Living Center, Las Vegas Springs Preserve, Nevada
Chattahoochee Nature Center, Roswell, Georgia
Nature Exchange, Various locations 
Turtle Bay Museum, Redding, California
Yaquina Head Interpretive Center, Newport, Oregon

Museums and cultural centers 
Museum of Vancouver, Vancouver, British Columbia
Nk'Mip Desert Cultural Centre, Osoyoos, British Columbia
Evergreen Brickworks, Toronto, Ontario
Archives of Falconry, Boise, Idaho
Kidspace Children's Museum, Pasadena, California
American Memorial Park, Saipan, Commonwealth of the Northern Mariana Islands
World War II Valor in the Pacific National Monument, Honolulu, Hawaii
National Children's Museum, Washington, DC
Transportation Hall, Heritage Park Historical Village, Calgary, Alberta
National Maritime Centre, Vancouver, British Columbia
Maxine and Jesse Whitney Museum, Prince William Sound College, Valdez, Alaska

Zoos and aquariums 
Vancouver Aquarium Marine Science Centre, Vancouver, British Columbia
Odense Zoo, Odense, Denmark
Oltramare Marine Park, Riccione, Italy
Polar Extremes, Edmonton Valley Zoo, Edmonton, Alberta
Zoomazium, Woodland Park Zoo, Seattle, Washington
Lacerte Children's Zoo, Dallas Zoo, Dallas, Texas
Al Ain Wildlife Park & Resort, Al Ain, United Arab Emirates

Science centers
Sultan Bin Abdulaziz Science and Technology Center, Khobar, Saudi Arabia
Telus World of Science, Edmonton, Alberta
Museo del Acero (Museum of Steel), Monterrey, Mexico
ʻImiloa Astronomy Center, Hilo, Hawaii

References 

Museum companies
Companies based in Vancouver